Rei Momo is the debut solo album by David Byrne and second overall studio album (after the 1981 collaborative album My Life in the Bush of Ghosts), released on 3 October 1989. The album consists of diverse Latin music styles from Cuba (rumba, mozambique, mambo, chachachá, bolero), the Dominican Republic (merengue), Puerto Rico (bomba), Colombia (cumbia, mapeyé) and Brazil (samba, pagode). The album is mostly sung in English and features guest appearances by Kirsty MacColl, Willie Colón and Celia Cruz, among others.

Release and promotion
The album was co-released by Luaka Bop and Sire on 3 October 1989. Initially, the album included three more tracks on the cassette tape than the LP: "Loco de Amor", "Good and Evil", and "Office Cowboy". All songs are present on the compact disc. David Byrne performed "Dirty Old Town" and "Loco de Amor" on Saturday Night Live'''s Thanksgiving show in 1989.

Reception

The album was well-received by critics. In a retrospective review for The Guardian'', Alexis Petridis wrote "Byrne’s first post-Talking-Heads solo album is a cut above and an underrated joy".

Track listing
All tracks composed by David Byrne; except where indicated.

Release history

Notes 

1989 debut albums
Albums produced by David Byrne
Albums produced by Steve Lillywhite
David Byrne albums
Luaka Bop albums
Sire Records albums
Samba albums
Merengue albums
Cumbia albums
Latin music albums by Scottish artists